Caffè del Doge is a coffee roaster and café franchise, based in Venice, Italy.

History 
Caffè del Doge was founded  the early 1950s by Ermenegildo Rizzardini. The first roasting facility was located near the Rialto Bridge. Since 1995, it has been operated by partners Bernardo Della Mea Francesco and Palombarini. In 1997, Caffè del Doge became a member of the Specialty Coffee Association of America and began exporting its beans to foreign markets in 1999.

References

External links
 Caffè del Doge website Italy
 Caffè del Doge website Netherlands

Companies based in Venice
Coffee companies of Italy
Franchises
Tourist attractions in Venice